The Audit Commission (AC) is one of the oldest government departments of the Government of Hong Kong, known as Audit Department before July 1, 1997. The Director of Audit is appointed by the Chief Executive (previously the Governors of Hong Kong). The Director reports to the Chief Executive, not the Legislative Council. Its main functions are "to provide independent, professional and quality audit services to the Legislative Council and public sector organisations in order to help the Government enhance public sector performance and accountability in Hong Kong." According to the Audit Ordinance (Cap. 122) the Director of Audit “has wide powers of access to the records of departments”, “can require any public officer to give an explanation and to furnish such information as he thinks fit to enable him to discharge his duties” and “is not subject to the direction or control of any other person or authority in performing his duties and when exercising his powers under the Ordinance.”

The Director of Audit submits three reports each year to the President of the Legislative Council: One on the Accounts of the Government of Hong Kong Special Administrative Region under section 12 of the Audit Ordinance and two on the results of value-for-money audits.

Recently, concerns have been raised as the Department has been used as a governmental tool to “deal with” departments that have not been “cooperative” to the government. Controversies have been drawn towards how the accounts of the Radio Television Hong Kong have been audited.

See also
Government of Hong Kong
Government departments and agencies in Hong Kong
Director of Audit (Hong Kong)

References

Hong Kong government departments and agencies
Hong Kong